SS Macedonia was a steamship that was built in England in 1912, renamed Pincio in 1922 and scrapped in Italy in 1932. She was built as an ocean liner for Greek owners, but within months of being completed she was converted into an armed merchant cruiser for the Royal Hellenic Navy. An Ottoman warship sank her in 1913 in the First Balkan War.

In 1916 Macedonias wreck was raised and she was returned to working order for a Dutch tramp company, which operated her until 1922. She then passed to Italian owners who renamed her Pincio. She was scrapped in 1932.

The ship should not be confused with others of the same name. P&O had an ocean liner called Macedonia that was built in 1904. HAPAG had a cargo ship called Macedonia that was built in 1900. Other ships have also borne the same name.

Building
Sir James Laing & Sons built Macedonia at Deptford in Sunderland, County Durham, as yard number 631. She was launched on 11 September 1911 and completed on 22 February 1912.

Macedonia had twin screws, each driven by a quadruple expansion engine built by George Clark, Ltd of Sunderland.

The difference was that her engines were almost twice as powerful.

The National Steam Navigation Company registered the ship on the Aegean island of Andros. Her code letters were HSWN. Her managers were Embiricos Brothers, who had founded the National Steam Navigation Company in 1908.

Greek ocean liner and auxiliary cruiser
Macedonias transatlantic career lasted only months. On 8 October 1912 the First Balkan War began. The Greek government chartered Macedonia, Themistocles, Athinai and another Greek ship to help prepare for the war. Thousands of Greeks living in the USA, who were either Hellenic Army reservists or volunteers, wanted transport home. But when left New York on 5 October she carried heavy artillery and ammunition from Bethlehem Steel, so by law she was unable to carry steerage passengers.

The Royal Hellenic Navy requisitioned Macedonia and had her converted into an armed merchant cruiser. Her primary armament was three US-made Mark 9 4-inch/50-caliber guns. The navy formed a squadron of four auxiliary cruisers in which she was the largest and newest. On 27 November 1912 she took part in a successful amphibious operation to land troops on Chios in the eastern Aegean, capturing the island from the Ottoman Empire.

Either during or after that operation, Macedonias steering gear was damaged. She put into port in Ermoupoli, on the Cycladean island of Syros.

On 14 January 1913 the  slipped through the Greek naval blockade of the Dardanelles, and started raiding in the Aegean. The next day she reached Syros and opened fire on Ermoupli with her two QF 6-inch and eight QF 4.7-inch guns. Macedonia was not in steam and so could not move. Hamidiye fired 152 shells, hitting not only Macedonia but also the town.

Macedonias commander, Captain 2nd Class P Tsoukalis, ordered his crew to scuttle her by opening her Kingston valves. The Turkish commander, Rauf Orbay, concluded that his attack had neutralised Macedonia, and at 1325 hrs Hamidiye sailed away.

The Greek authorities claimed that Macedonia was raised ten days later and taken to Piraeus for repairs. But in fact she never returned to service with either the Navy or the National Steam Navigation Company.

Dutch cargo ship
In 1916 a new Dutch tramp steamship company, Hollandsche Algemeene Atlantische Scheepvaartmaatschappij, was formed. It bought Macedonia for three million guilders and had her towed to Rotterdam, where the Machinefabriek voorheen onder de firma B. Wilton repaired her. A pair of triple expansion engines was installed. Like her original engines they were built by George Clark, Ltd. But they were far less powerful, being rated at only 500 NHP.

Hollandsche Algemeene Atlantische SM changed Macedonias port of registration to Amsterdam. Her Dutch code letters were PJTN. She worked as a cargo ship until the company went bankrupt in 1922.

Italian ocean liner
Lloyd Latino, an Italian subsidiary of the French Société Générale de Transports Maritimes, bought Macedonia and had her restored to passenger service. A pair of George Clark engines, either her original ones or a new pair with the same dimensions, was installed. Their power was now rated at 913 NHP. Lloyd Latino renamed the ship Pincio and changed her port of registry to Genoa. Her Italian code letters were PCUI.

Lloyd Latino ran passenger services between Mediterranean ports and South America. In 1928 Pincios route was Genoa – Marseille – Rio de Janeiro – Santos – Montevideo – Buenos Aires. Her outward voyages also included calls at Valencia and Almeria in Spain and optionally at Dakar in French West Africa. Her return voyages included a call at Las Palmas.

Pincio was scrapped early in 1932 at La Spezia in northern Italy.

References

Bibliography

External links
 – includes image of Hollandsche Algemeene Atlantische SM house flag
 – includes historic colour postcard of the ship as Pincio

1911 ships
Auxiliary cruisers
Cruisers of the Hellenic Navy
Maritime incidents in 1913
Ocean liners
Passenger ships of Greece
Ships built on the River Wear
Steamships of Greece
Steamships of Italy
Steamships of the Netherlands